Area code 604 is a telephone area code that serves southwestern British Columbia, Canada: the Lower Mainland, Sunshine Coast, Howe Sound / Sea to Sky Corridor, Fraser Valley and the lower Fraser Canyon regions. It primarily serves the city of Vancouver and surrounding regions.

History

Area code 604 is one of the original 86 area codes assigned in 1947 in the contiguous United States and the then-nine provinces of Canada. It served the entire province of British Columbia. Until 1988, 604 also included Point Roberts, Washington, a pene-enclave of the United States; Point Roberts was transferred in 1988 to area code 206 and is now served by area code 360.

Despite British Columbia's growth in the second half of the 20th century, 604 remained the province's sole area code for nearly 50 years. By the mid-1990s, however, the need for a new area code in the province could no longer be staved off, largely because of Canada's number allocation system. Every competitive local exchange carrier in the country is allocated blocks of 10,000 numbers, corresponding to a single three-digit prefix, for every rate centre in which it offers service, even for the smallest hamlets. 

While smaller rate centres usually do not need that many numbers, once a number is assigned to a carrier and rate centre, it cannot be moved elsewhere, even to a larger rate centre. Additionally, some larger cities are split between multiple rate centres that have never been amalgamated. That resulted in thousands of wasted numbers, and the growing popularity of cell phones, pagers and fax machines has only exacerbated that problem. The number shortage was particularly severe in the Lower Mainland, which was home to most of the province's landlines and most of its other telecommunications devices requiring phone numbers.

In 1997, 604 was cut back to the Lower Mainland, with the new area code 250 created for the remainder of the province.

The 1997 split was intended as a long-term solution for the Lower Mainland. However, within three years, 604 was close to exhaustion, once again because of the aforementioned number allocation problem and the continued proliferation of cell phones and pagers. Numbers tended to be used up fairly quickly in Vancouver and its immediate neighbours because of their rapid growth, but the number allocation problem was still severe in the Lower Mainland as a whole.

On November 3, 2001, area code 778 was implemented as a concentrated overlay for the two largest regional districts in the Lower Mainland, Metro Vancouver and the Fraser Valley Regional District. The experiment was announced in NANP planning letter PL-246. The remainder of the Lower Mainland continued to use only 604, but the addition of area code 778 required the implementation of ten-digit dialling throughout the region.

The Canadian Radio-television and Telecommunications Commission (CRTC) announced on June 7, 2007 that 778 would become an overlay for the entire province on July 4, 2007 after the same number allocation problem that had afflicted 604 was bringing 250 close to exhaustion. Effective June 23, 2008, ten-digit dialling became mandatory in British Columbia, and attempts to make a seven-digit call triggered an intercept message with a reminder of the new rule. After September 12, 2008, seven-digit dialling was no longer functional. Overlays have become the preferred method of relief in Canada, as they offer an easy workaround for the number allocation problem.

The incumbent local exchange carrier in 604 and 778 is Telus. Through "number portability" and sub-allocation of all numbers in some exchanges to a competitor, many numbers in the 778 area code are now serviced by Shaw Cablesystems.

On June 1, 2013, area code 236 was implemented as a distributed overlay of area codes 604, 250, and 778 and was expected to be exhausted in May 2020. As a result, area code 672 was implemented as an additional distributed overlay on May 4, 2019 to relieve area codes 604, 250, 778, and 236.

Communities included
Abbotsford217 226 302 504 556 557 615 621 743 744 746 751 752 755 756 768 776 832 850 851 852 853 854 855 859 864 870
Agassiz–Kent–Harrison Hot Springs–Chehalis796
Aldergrove308 309 409 607 613 614 624 625 626 627 807 825 835 856 857 866 897 996
Anmore461 469
Boston Bar867
Bowen Island947
Burnaby250 290 291 292 293 294 296 297 298 299 311 312 327 328 341 412 419 420 421 422 430 431 432 433 434 435 436 437 438 439 444 450 451 453 454 456 473 570 571 610 611 612 619 
Chilliwack316 378 391 392 393 402 407 490 701 702 703 784 791 792 793 794 795 798 799 819 823 824 843 845 846 847 858 991 997
Coquitlam931 936 939
Delta940 943 946 948 952 963
Gibsons840 883 885 886 887 
Hope201 206 712 749 750 860 869
Langley (city) and (district municipality)427 455 508 509 513 514 530 532 533 534 539 546 757 881 882 888 994
Maple Ridge460 462 463 465 466 467
Mission286 287 289 410 814 820 826
New Westminster200 202 209 237 239 245 306 351 357 374 375 376 377 395 512 515 516 517 518 519 520 521 522 523 524 525 526 527 528 529 537 540 544 545 551 553 616 617 636 759 760 761 762 763 764 765 766 777 787 788 805 808 813 818 822 828 833 838 862 868 878 889 908 920
North Vancouver (city) and (district municipality)210 243 770 903 904 914 924 929 960 971 973 980 981 982 983 984 985 986 987 988 990 995 998
Pemberton894
Pender HarbourSee Gibsons
Pitt Meadows458 460 465
Port Coquitlam342 464 468 471 472 474 552 554 927 941 942 944 945
Port Moody461 469 492 917 931 933 934 936 937 939 949
Powell River208 223 344 413 414 483 485 486 487 489 578
Richmond204 207 214 227 231 232 233 234 241 242 244 246 247 248 249 270 271 272 273 274 275 276 277 278 279 284 285 288 295 303 304 330 370 394 448 821
Roberts CreekSee Gibsons
Sechelt740 741 747 989 
Squamish213 389 390 405 567 815 848 849 890 892 898 919
Surrey is divided into the following local rate centres:
Cloverdale574 575 576 577 579
Newton501 502 503 507 543 547 561 562 572 573 590 591 592 594 595 596 597 598 599 635
Whalley495 496 497 498 580 581 582 583 584 585 586 587 588 589 634 930 951 953 954 955 957
White Rock305 385 531 535 536 538 541 542 548
Vancouver205 215 216 218 219 220 221 222 224 225 228 230 235 240 250 251 252 253 254 255 257 258 259 260 261 262 263 264 266 267 268 269 280 281 282 290 291 292 293 294 296 297 298 299 301 307 312 313 314 315 317 318 319 320 321 322 323 324 325 326 327 328 329 331 333 334 335 336 338 339 340 341 343 345 346 347 348 349 352 353 354 355 356 358 360 361 362 363 364 365 366 367 368 369 379 386 387 396 397 398 401 403 404 408 412 415 416 417 418 419 420 421 422 423 424 428 429 430 431 432 433 434 435 436 437 438 439 440 441 442 443 444 445 446 450 451 453 454 456 473 482 484 488 494 499 500 505 506 559 563 565 566 568 570 571 601 602 603 605 606 608 609 612 618 619 620 622 623 628 629 630 631 632 633 637 638 639 640 641 642 643 644 645 646 647 648 649 650 651 652 653 654 655 656 657 658 659 660 661 662 663 664 665 666 667 668 669 671 674 675 676 677 678 679 680 681 682 683 684 685 686 687 688 689 690 691 692 693 694 695 696 697 699 704 707 708 709 710 713 714 715 716 717 718 719 720 721 722 723 724 725 726 727 728 729 730 731 732 733 734 735 736 737 738 739 742 753 754 757 767 771 773 775 779 780 781 782 783 785 786 789 790 800 801 802 803 806 809 812 816 817 822 827 829 830 831 834 836 837 839 841 842 844 861 871 872 873 874 875 876 877 879 880 891 893 895 899 909 910 915 916 918 928 961 968 970 974 975 977 978 979 992 999
West Vancouver229 281 670 758 912 913 920 921 922 923 925 926
Whistler203 388 400 402 493 698 902 905 906 907 932 935 938 962 964 965 966 967 972
Yale863

See also
Area code 250
Area codes 778, 236, and 672
List of NANP area codes

References

External links
CNA exchange list for area +1-604
NANP Planning Letter PL-246
Telecom archives
 Area Code Map of Canada

604
Communications in British Columbia
Lower Mainland
Sea-to-Sky Corridor
Sunshine Coast (British Columbia)
Telecommunications-related introductions in 1947